Shinobu may refer to:

Shinobu, a unisex Japanese given name.
Shinobu (band), an American indie rock band
Mount Shinobu, a mountain in the center of Fukushima, Fukushima, Japan

See also
Shinobi no Mono (忍びの者), is an alternative name for ninja
Ninin Ga Shinobuden, a manga and anime series